Gorthiya Mahadev Temple (Gujarati : ગોરઠીયા મહાદેવ મંદિર) is a Hindu Temple dedicated to Lord Shiva, located in the town of Takaar, about 8 km from Ranasan in Prantij in Gujarat state in India.

Fairs 
Fairs are held here every year on the event of Shivaratri, Guru Purnima , Maha Bij & Aatham which are attended by thousands of people.

Big events 
Maha Shivaratri and Guru Purnima is the two big events of the year and thousands of people attending it.

References 
Facebook
Twitter

Hindu temples in Gujarat
Sabarkantha district
Shiva temples in Gujarat